Milton B. Goff (December 17, 1831 – November 8, 1890) was the seventh chancellor of the University of Pittsburgh, then called the Western University of Pennsylvania,  serving from 1884 to 1890.  He also served as acting chancellor from 1880 to 1881.

External links

References

Chancellors of the University of Pittsburgh
1831 births
1890 deaths